David Longwell House is a historic building in Monongahela, Pennsylvania.

It is designated as a historic residential landmark/farmstead by the Washington County History & Landmarks Foundation.

References

External links
[ National Register nomination form]

Houses on the National Register of Historic Places in Pennsylvania
Italianate architecture in Pennsylvania
Houses completed in 1872
Houses in Washington County, Pennsylvania
Monongahela, Pennsylvania
National Register of Historic Places in Washington County, Pennsylvania